SP Tableware was a UCI Continental cycling team based in Greece. It was founded in 2009 and dropped to National level for the 2015 season onwards.

Major results

2009
Overall Romanian Cycling Tour, Alexey Shchebelin
Prologue, Ioannis Tamouridis
Stage 7, Alexey Shchebelin

2011
Stage 3 Jelajah Malaysia, Ioannis Tamouridis
Stage 2 International Tour of Hellas, Ioannis Tamouridis
Stage 3 Romanian Cycling Tour, Ioannis Tamouridis
Stage 1 Tour of Szeklerland, Ioannis Tamouridis

2012
Stage 2 Tour d'Algérie, Joaquin Sobrino
Circuit d'Alger, Ioannis Tamouridis
Stage 3 International Tour of Hellas, Periklis Ilias
Stages 1 (ITT) & 7 Romanian Cycling Tour, Ioannis Tamouridis
Stage 8 Romanian Cycling Tour, Víctor de la Parte
 National Time Trial Championship, Ioannis Tamouridis
Overall Sibiu Cycling Tour, Víctor de la Parte
Stage 1, Víctor de la Parte
Stage 4b Tour of Szeklerland, Ioannis Tamouridis
Stage 3 Okolo Jiznich Cech, Joaquin Sobrino

2013
Overall Tour d'Algérie, Víctor de la Parte
Stage 5, Víctor de la Parte
Stage 3 Tour de Tipaza, Georgios Karatzios
Stage 4 Five Rings of Moscow, Joaquin Sobrino
Stages 2 & 5 Romanian Cycling Tour, Georgios Bouglas

2014
Stage 4 Tour de Taiwan, Ioannis Tamouridis
 National Time Trial Championship, Georgios Bouglas

Final roster

References

UCI Continental Teams (Europe)
Cycling teams established in 2009
Cycling teams disestablished in 2014
Cycling teams based in Greece